Kulattur Nayakarpatti is a village in the Aranthangi revenue block of Pudukkottai district, Tamil Nadu, India.

Demographics 

 census, Kulattur had a total population of 547 with 271 males and 276 females in 136 households, with 52 children of age 0–6. 197 men and 122 women were literate.

References

Villages in Pudukkottai district
Palayam